Jack Gibbs (born 3 June 2000) is an English cricketer. He made his first-class debut on 31 March 2019, for Cardiff MCCU against Sussex, as part of the Marylebone Cricket Club University fixtures. Prior to his first-class debut, he played Second XI cricket for Gloucestershire and was part of the ECB Elite Player programme. In 2017, he was named the under-17 bowler of the year by the Devon Cricket Board.

References

External links
 

2000 births
Living people
English cricketers
Cardiff MCCU cricketers
Cricketers from Birmingham, West Midlands
English cricketers of the 21st century